Niall Tinney is an Irish Gaelic footballer who plays for his club Irvinestown and the Fermanagh county team.

Tinney was an integral part of Fermanagh's meteoric rise to the latter stages of the 2004 All-Ireland Senior Football Championship.

Honours
 All Stars Young Footballer of the Year: 2004

References

Year of birth missing (living people)
Living people
All Stars Young Footballers of the Year
Fermanagh inter-county Gaelic footballers
Irvinestown Gaelic footballers